The European bass (Dicentrarchus labrax) is a primarily ocean-going fish native to the waters off Europe's western and southern and Africa's northern coasts, though it can also be found in shallow coastal waters and river mouths during the summer months. It is one of only six species in its family, Moronidae, collectively called the temperate basses.

It is fished and raised commercially and is considered the most important fish currently cultured in the Mediterranean. In Ireland and the United Kingdom, the popular restaurant fish sold and consumed as sea bass is exclusively the European bass.
In North America, it is widely known by one of its Italian names, branzino.

European bass are a slow-growing species that take several years to reach adulthood. Individuals are silvery grey and sometimes a dark-bluish color on the back.

Juveniles form schools and feed on invertebrates, while adults are less social and prefer to consume other fish. They are generally found in the littoral zone near the banks of rivers, lagoons, and estuaries during the summer and migrate offshore during the winter. European sea bass feed on prawns, crabs and small fish. Though it is a sought-after gamefish, it is listed as Least Concern by the International Union for Conservation of Nature because it is widespread and there are no known major threats.

Taxonomy and phylogeny
 The European bass was first described in 1758 by Swedish zoologist Carl Linnaeus in his work Systema Naturae. He named it Perca labrax. In the century and a half following, it was classified under a variety of new synonyms, with Dicentrarchus labrax winning out as the accepted name in 1987. Its generic name, Dicentrarchus, derives from Greek, from the presence of two anal spines, "di" meaning two, "kentron" meaning sting, and "archos" meaning anus. The European bass is sold under dozens of common names in various languages. In the British Isles, it is known as the "European bass," "European seabass," "common bass," "capemouth," "king of the mullets," "sea bass," "sea dace," "sea perch," "white mullet," "white salmon," or simply "bass".

There are two genetically distinct populations of wild European bass. The first is found in the northeast Atlantic Ocean, and the second is in the western Mediterranean Sea. The two populations are separated by a relatively narrow distance in a region known as the Almeria-Oran oceanographic front, located east of the Spanish city of Almería. The exact reason for this separation is unknown, as the geographic divide should not account for the lack of gene flow between the two populations. The larval stage of the European bass can last up to 3 months, during which it cannot swim well, and even a small amount of water flow should transport some individuals between the two regions. In addition, juveniles can survive temperature and salinity changes, and adults can migrate hundreds of miles.

Distribution and habitat
European bass habitats include estuaries, lagoons, coastal waters, and rivers. It is found in a large part of the eastern Atlantic Ocean, from southern Norway to Senegal. It can also be found in the entire Mediterranean Sea and in the southern Black Sea but is absent from the Baltic sea. It is a seasonally migratory species, moving further inshore and north in summer.

Diet and behaviour

The European bass is mostly a night hunter, feeding on small fish, polychaetes, cephalopods, and crustaceans. They spawn from March to June, mostly in inshore waters. As fry they are pelagic, but as they develop, they move into estuaries, where they stay for a year or two.

Fisheries and aquaculture

Capture fisheries
Annual catches of wild European bass are relatively modest, fluctuating between 8,500 and 11,900 tonnes from 2000–2009. Most reported catches originate from the Atlantic Ocean, with France typically reporting the highest catches. In the Mediterranean, Italy used to report the largest catches but has been surpassed by Egypt.

The fish has come under increasing pressure from commercial fishing and became the focus in the United Kingdom of a conservation effort by recreational anglers. The Republic of Ireland has strict laws regarding bass. In a scientific advisory (June 2013), it is stressed that fishing mortality is increasing. The total biomass has been declining since 2005. Total biomass assumed as the best stock size indicator in the last two years (2011–2012) was 32% lower than the total biomass in the three previous years (2008–2010).

Farming
European bass was one of Europe's first fish to be farmed commercially. Historically, they were cultured in coastal lagoons and tidal reservoirs before mass-production techniques were developed in the late 1960s. It is the most important commercial fish widely cultured in the Mediterranean. Greece, Turkey, Italy, Spain, Croatia, and Egypt are the most important farming countries. Annual production was more than 120,000 tonnes in 2010.

References

External links
 

European bass
Fish of Europe
Marine fauna of North Africa
Fish of the Black Sea
Fish of the Mediterranean Sea
Fish of the North Sea
European bass
Taxa named by Carl Linnaeus